Howard Head (July 31, 1914 in Philadelphia, Pennsylvania – March 3, 1991) was an American aeronautical engineer who is credited with the invention of the first commercially successful aluminum laminate skis and the oversized tennis racket. Head founded the ski (and later tennis racquet) making firm Head in 1950. Later he became chairman of Prince Manufacturing Inc. The U.S. patents for the laminate skis and oversized tennis racket are in the name of Howard Head.  He graduated from Harvard College in 1936.

Ski equipment 

In 1947, Howard Head was an aircraft engineer for Glenn L. Martin Company in Baltimore, and went skiing for the first time. Head was frustrated with the quality of the clumsy and heavy wooden skis, which made skiing very difficult for beginners. He decided to develop a lighter and more efficient ski that could make skiing much easier for everyone. He left his job and devoted all his time and energy to developing the skis and supported himself with earnings from poker.

The skis developed by Head were based on the structural principles that he had learned during his experience as an aircraft engineer. In a warehouse he rented from Albert Gunther Inc in an alley off of Biddle Street in downtown Baltimore, he used a technique known as metal sandwich construction. The first skis he made consisted of two light layers of aluminum bonded to sidewalls of thin plywood, with a center filling of honeycomb plastic.  Although these skis were very light, they all broke quite quickly during trials.  Head did not give up on his idea, and was encouraged by several professional skiers, including 1939 World Champion Emile Allais and ski instructors Clif Taylor and Neil Robinson, who assured Head that he would love to use his skis if they did not break.  Throughout that winter Head would make a ski pair and send it out to Robinson, who returned it to Head after it broke.  Head figured out the flaws of his design, came up with modifications, sent the new ski pair to Robinson, and the process repeated. By the end of the winter of 1947, Head came up with skis that were as strong as wooden skis but were half the weight.

In order to make his skis more efficient, Head made several other changes, like substituting plywood for honeycomb plastic, covering the bottom of the ski with polyethylene to avoid the problem of icy bottoms and adopting continuous steel edges to harden the edges of the ski.  The new improved skis were almost as heavy as the conventional wooden skis, but were stronger and easier to control.  Head skis helped to popularize alpine skiing in the U.S.; the innovative equipment made turning significantly easier.

In 1950, Head founded the Head Ski Company, which became very successful.  Within a couple of years it was the major supplier of alpine skis in the U.S. and influenced ski design worldwide. The company later diversified into tennis and other racquet sports; its most notable product was the innovative Arthur Ashe racquet, constructed of aluminum honeycomb. Howard Head sold the company to AMF in 1969 and retired.  After a number of takeovers and acquisitions, HEAD, N.V. is currently based in Kennelbach, Austria (operational) and Amsterdam, Netherlands (corporate offices).

Tennis racquet 
After retiring, Head decided to take tennis lessons and for this purpose he got himself a tennis ball machine, which was manufactured by Prince Manufacturing Inc.  Although Howard was not very good at tennis, he figured out that the equipment for the game needed a lot of improvement or he was going to need a lot more practice. To begin with he became the majority shareholder and chairman of the board of Prince.  While Head considerably improved the design of the ball machine, he still did not get any better at the game. He believed that a big factor that was slowing his improvement was the small sweetspot of the tennis racquet.  In order to make the game of tennis easier, Head came up with the design of oversized racquet.  He filed and obtained a patent that covered tennis racquets with size 95–135 square inches.  He also pioneered the development of the graphite racquet, which eventually became the industry standard, replacing wooden racquets.

Although Prince was the first company to patent oversize racquets, the Bentley Fortissimo preceded the patent by two years, causing Germany to invalidate it. Weed also introduced an oversize racquet in 1975, before the first Prince oversize, the aluminum Prince Classic, was introduced.

External links
 Howard Head
 An interview with Howard Broody. – the physics behind Head's Racquet
 Invention at play.org – inventors – Howard Head
 Head.com  – timeline
 Prince Tennis.com – history

References

American manufacturing businesspeople
Tennis equipment
American aerospace engineers
Businesspeople from Philadelphia
1914 births
1991 deaths
William Penn Charter School alumni
20th-century American businesspeople
Engineers from Pennsylvania
20th-century American engineers
20th-century American inventors
Harvard College alumni